Pello (formerly Turtola) is a municipality of Finland. The municipality is on the national border with Sweden, by the Tornionjoki-river.
which 
is water. The population density is
.

The municipality is unilingually Finnish, according to the legal definition in Finland.

History 
The name of Pello is ultimately derived from the word pelto, field; which may have been the original name of the village. The weak grade stem of pelto is pello- (e.g. pellon - genitive case form of pelto), through which the name was corrupted to its current form. The name of Turtola refers to a male name Turto, a Finnish form of the Scandinavian name Tord.

During the Late Middle Ages and the 16th century, Pello was the northernmost Finnish village in the Tornio Valley. It was a part of the Tornio parish until 1606, when said parish was divided into Alatornio and Ylitornio, from which the latter included Turtola and Pello. 

After Russia conquered Finland in 1809, Ylitornio was split into two parts. The villages of Pello and Turtola were also split, which is why there is a Pello and a Turtola (Svanstein) in Sweden. The northern parts of Ylitornio became a separate parish and municipality in 1867, called Turtola after its most significant village at the time. The village of Pello later surpassed Turtola, thus the municipality was renamed to Pello in 1949.

References

External links

Municipality of Pello – Official website 
Tourism of Pello – Official website 

 
Divided cities
Populated places established in 1867
Finland–Sweden border crossings